Peter Reid (born 27 May 1969 in Montreal, Quebec) is a Canadian elite level triathlete. He has gained fame mainly by winning ten Ironman triathlons, including winning the Ironman World Championship (in Kailua Kona, Hawaii) three times. During his career as a triathlete Reid lived and trained in Victoria, British Columbia. In June 2006, Reid announced that he was retiring from triathlon. He is now a float plane pilot on Canada's west coast. Reid was inducted into Canada Sports Hall of Fame in 2011, the BC Sports Hall of Fame in 2013 and the Greater Victoria Sports Hall of Fame in 2010.

Results

References

External links 
 
 
 Triathlon Documentary featuring Reid

1969 births
Living people
Canadian male triathletes
Ironman world champions
Sportspeople from Montreal